Oebalus mexicanus is a species of stink bug in the family Pentatomidae. It is found in Central America and North America.

References

Articles created by Qbugbot
Insects described in 1944
Pentatomini